Linospadix microcaryus is a species of flowering plant in the family Arecaceae. It is found only in northeastern Queensland.

It is threatened by habitat loss.

References

microcaryus
Palms of Australia
Near threatened flora of Australia
Nature Conservation Act rare biota
Near threatened biota of Queensland
Rare flora of Australia
Flora of Queensland
Plants described in 1915
Taxobox binomials not recognized by IUCN